The resurrection of Jesus is the Christian belief that God raised Jesus on the third day after his crucifixion, starting – or restoring – his exalted life as Christ and Lord. According to the New Testament writing, Jesus was firstborn from the dead, ushering in the Kingdom of God. He appeared to his disciples, calling the apostles to the Great Commission of forgiving sin and baptizing repenters, and ascended to Heaven.

For the Christian tradition, the bodily resurrection was the restoration to life of a transformed body powered by spirit, as described by Paul and the Gospel authors, that led to the establishment of Christianity. In Christian theology, the resurrection of Jesus is "the central mystery of the Christian faith". It provides the foundation for that faith, as commemorated by Easter, along with Jesus's life, death and sayings. For Christians, his resurrection is the guarantee that all the Christian dead will be resurrected at Christ's  (second coming).

In secular and liberal Christian scholarship, the post-resurrection appearances of Jesus are explained as visionary experiences, which gave the impetus to the belief in the exaltation of Jesus, and a resumption of the missionary activity of Jesus's followers.

Biblical accounts 

The conviction that Jesus was raised from the dead is found in the earliest evidence of Christian origins.

Paul and the first Christians

The moment of resurrection itself is not described in any of the gospels, but all four contain passages in which Jesus is portrayed as predicting his death and resurrection, or contain allusions that "the reader will understand". The New Testament writings do not contain any descriptions of a resurrection, but rather accounts of an empty tomb and post-resurrection appearances of Jesus.

One of the letters sent by Paul the Apostle to one of the early Greek churches, the First Epistle to the Corinthians, contains one of the earliest Christian creeds referring to post-mortem appearances of Jesus, and expressing the belief that he was raised from the dead, namely 1 Corinthians 15:3–8. It is widely accepted that this creed predates Paul and the writing of First Corinthians. Scholars have contended that in his presentation of the resurrection, Paul refers to this as an earlier authoritative tradition, transmitted in a rabbinic style, that he received and has passed on to the church at Corinth. Geza Vermes writes that the creed is "a tradition he [Paul] has inherited from his seniors in the faith concerning the death, burial and resurrection of Jesus". The creed's ultimate origins are probably within the Jerusalem apostolic community, having been formalised and passed on within a few years of the resurrection. Hans Grass argues for an origin in Damascus, and according to Paul Barnett, this creedal formula, and others, were variants of the "one basic early tradition that Paul "received" in Damascus from Ananias in about 34 [AD]" after his conversion.

In the Jerusalem  (Church), from which Paul received this creed, the phrase "died for our sins" probably was an apologetic rationale for the death of Jesus as being part of God's plan and purpose, as evidenced in the scriptures. For Paul, it gained a deeper significance, providing "a basis for the salvation of sinful Gentiles apart from the Torah." The phrase "died for our sins" was derived from Isaiah, especially 53:4-11, and 4 Maccabees, especially 6:28–29. "Raised on the third day" is derived from Hosea 6:1-2:

Paul, writing to the members of the church at Corinth, said that Jesus appeared to him in the same fashion in which he appeared to the earlier witnesses. In 2 Corinthians 12 Paul described "a man in Christ [presumably Paul himself] who ... was caught up to the third heaven", and while the language is obscure, a plausible interpretation is that the man believed he saw Jesus enthroned at the right hand of God.

The many Pauline references affirming his belief in the resurrection include:
 Romans 1:3–4: "...concerning his Son, who was descended from David according to the flesh and designated the Son of God in power according to the Spirit of holiness by his resurrection from the dead, Jesus Christ our Lord".
 2 Timothy 2:8: "Remember Jesus Christ, raised from the dead... this is my gospel for which I am suffering even to the point of being chained like a criminal. But God’s word is not chained...".
 1 Corinthians 15:3–7: "...that Christ died for our sins in accordance with the Scriptures, that he was buried, that he was raised on the third day in accordance with the Scriptures..."

Gospels and Acts 

Jesus is described as the "firstborn from the dead," , the first to be raised from the dead, and thereby acquiring the "special status of the firstborn as the preeminent son and heir." His resurrection is also the guarantee that all the Christian dead will be resurrected at Christ's .

After the resurrection, Jesus is portrayed as proclaiming "eternal salvation" through the disciples in the intermediate ending of Mark 16:8), and as calling the apostles to the Great Commission, as described in Matthew 28:16–20, Mark 16:14–18, Luke 24:44–49, Acts 1:4–8, and John 20:19–23, in which the disciples receive the call "to let the world know the good news of a victorious Saviour and the very presence of God in the world by the spirit." According to these texts, Jesus says that they "will receive power when the Holy Spirit has come upon you", that "repentance and forgiveness of sins is to be proclaimed in [the Messiah's] name to all nations, beginning from Jerusalem", and that "[i]f you forgive the sins of any, they are forgiven them; if you retain the sins of any, they are retained".

The shorter version of the Gospel of Mark ends with the discovery of the empty tomb by Mary Magdalene, Salome, and "Mary the mother of James". A young man in a white robe at the site of the tomb announced to them that Jesus has risen, and instructed them to "tell Peter and the disciples that he will meet them in Galilee, 'just as he told you'" (Mark 16). The longer version says in 16:9 further forwards, which is a later addition, that Jesus appeared to Mary Magdalene, then to two followers outside Jerusalem, and then to the eleven remaining Apostles, commissioning them to spread "the good news" (often referred to as "The Great Commission"), saying: "The one who believes and is baptized will be saved; but the one who does not believe will be condemned."

In Matthew, Luke and John, the resurrection announcement is followed by appearances of Jesus first to Mary Magdalene then to other followers. The Gospel of Matthew describes a single appearance in Galilee, Luke describes several appearances in Jerusalem, and John mentions appearances in both Jerusalem and Galilee. At some point, these appearances ceased in the early Christian community, as reflected in the Gospel narratives: the "Acts of the Apostles" says that "for forty days he had continued to appear to them". The Gospel of Luke describes Jesus ascending to heaven at a location near Bethany.

In the Gospel of Matthew, an angel appeared to Mary Magdalene at the empty tomb, telling her that Jesus is not there because he has been raised from the dead, and instructing her to tell the other followers to go to Galilee, to meet Jesus. Jesus then appeared to Mary Magdalene and "the other Mary" at the tomb; and next, based on Mark 16:7, Jesus appeared to all the disciples on a mountain in Galilee, where Jesus claimed authority over heaven and earth, and commissioned the disciples to preach the gospel to the whole world. Matthew presents Jesus's second appearance as an apotheosis (deification), commissioning his followers to "make disciples of all nations, baptizing them in the name of the Father and of the Son and of the Holy Spirit, [20] and teaching them to obey everything that I have commanded you." In this message, the end times are delayed "to bring the world to discipleship".

In the Gospel of Luke, "the women who had come with him from Galilee" come to his tomb, which they find empty. Two angelic beings appeared to announce that Jesus is not there but has been raised. Jesus then appeared to two followers on their way to Emmaus, who notify the eleven remaining Apostles, who respond that Jesus has appeared to Peter. While they were describing this, Jesus appeared again, explaining that he is the messiah who was raised from the dead according to the scriptures "and that repentance and forgiveness of sins is to be proclaimed in his name to all nations, beginning from Jerusalem". In Luke–Acts (two works from the same author) he then ascended into heaven, his rightful home.

In the Gospel of John, Mary Magdalene found the tomb empty and informed Peter. She then saw two angels, after which Jesus himself appeared to her. In the evening, Jesus appeared to the other followers, followed by another appearance a week later. He later appeared in Galilee to Peter, Thomas, and two other followers, commanding Peter to take care of his followers.

In Acts of the Apostles, Jesus appeared to the apostles for forty days and commanded them to stay in Jerusalem, after which Jesus ascended to heaven, followed by the coming of the Holy Spirit at Pentecost and the missionary task of the early church.

Jewish-Hellenistic background

Jewish

In Judaism, the idea of resurrection first emerges in the 2nd-century BC Book of Daniel as a belief in the resurrection of the soul alone, which was then developed by the Pharisees as a belief in bodily resurrection, an idea completely alien to the Greeks. Josephus tells of the three main Jewish sects of the 1st century AD, that the Sadducees held that both soul and body perished at death; the Essenes that the soul was immortal but the flesh was not; and the Pharisees that the soul was immortal and that the body would be resurrected to house it. Of these three positions, Jesus and the early Christians appear to have been closest to that of the Pharisees. Steve Mason notes that for the Pharisees, "the new body is a special, holy body", which is different from the old body, "a view shared to some extent by the ex-Pharisee Paul (1. Cor. 15:35ff)".

The evidence from Jewish texts and from tomb inscriptions points to a more complex reality: for example, when the 2nd century BC author of the Book of Daniel wrote that "many of those sleeping in the dust shall awaken", religion scholar Dag Øistein Endsjø believes he probably had in mind a rebirth as angelic beings (metaphorically described as stars in God's Heaven, stars having been identified with angels from early times); such a rebirth would rule out a bodily resurrection, as angels were believed to be fleshless. Other texts range from the traditional Old Testament view that the soul would spend eternity in the underworld, to a metaphorical belief in the raising of the spirit. Most avoided defining what resurrection might imply, but a resurrection of the flesh was a marginal belief. As Outi Lehtipuu states, "belief in resurrection was far from being an established doctrine" of Second Temple Judaism.

Greco-Roman

The Greeks held that the soul of a meritorious man could be translated into a god in the process of apotheosis (divination) which then transferred them to a special place of honor. Successors of Alexander the Great made this idea very well known throughout the Middle East through coins bearing his image, a privilege previously reserved for gods. The idea was adopted by the Roman emperors, and in the Imperial Roman concept of apotheosis, the earthly body of the recently deceased emperor was replaced by a new and divine one as he ascended into heaven. These stories proliferated in the middle to late first century.

The apotheosised dead remained recognisable to those who met them, as when Romulus appeared to witnesses after his death, but as the biographer Plutarch explained of this incident, while something within humans comes from the gods and returns to them after death, this happens "only when it is most completely separated and set free from the body, and becomes altogether pure, fleshless, and undefiled".

Burial and empty tomb
Scholars differ on the historicity of the empty tomb story and the relation with the burial stories and the postmortem appearances. Scholars also differ on whether Jesus received a decent burial. Points of contention are (1) whether Jesus's body was taken off the cross before sunset or left on the cross to decay, (2) whether his body was taken off the cross and buried specifically by Joseph of Arimathea, or by the Sanhedrin or a group of Jews in general, and (3) whether he was entombed (and if so, what kind of tomb) or buried in a common grave.

Burial

An often noted argument in favor of a decent burial before sunset is the Jewish custom, based on Deuteronomy 21:22-23, which says the body must not be left exposed overnight, but must be buried that day. This is also attested in the Temple Scroll of the Essenes, and in Josephus's Jewish War 4.5.2§317, describing the burial of crucified Jewish insurgents before sunset. Reference is made to the Digesta, a Roman Law Code from the 6th century AD, which contains material from the 2nd century AD, stating that "the bodies of those who have been punished are only buried when this has been requested and permission granted." Burial of people who were executed by crucifixion is also attested by archaeological finds from Yehohanan, a body of an apparently crucified man with a nail in the heel which could not be removed who was buried in a tomb.

Contra a decent burial, Martin Hengel has argued that Jesus was buried in disgrace as an executed criminal who died a shameful death, a view which is "now widely accepted and has become entrenched in scholarly literature." John Dominic Crossan argued that Jesus followers did not know what happened to the body. According to Crossan, Joseph of Arimathea is "a total Markan creation in name, in place, and in function", arguing that Jesus's followers inferred from Deut. 21:22-23 that Jesus was buried by a group of law-abiding Jews, as described in Acts 13:29. 

New Testament scholar Dale Allison writes that this story was adapted by Mark, turning the group of Jews into a specific person. Roman practice was often to leave the body on the stake, denying an honorable or family burial, stating that "the dogs were waiting." Archaeologist Byron McCane argues that it was customary to dispose of the dead immediately, yet concludes that "Jesus was buried in disgrace in a criminal's tomb". British New Testament scholar Maurice Casey also notes that "Jewish criminals were supposed to receive a shameful and dishonourable burial," and argues that Jesus was indeed buried by Joseph of Arimathea, but in a tomb for criminals owned by the Sanhedrin. He therefore rejects the empty tomb narrative as legendary. 

New Testament historian Bart D. Ehrman writes that it can't be known what happened to Jesus's body; he doubts that Jesus had a decent burial, and also thinks that it is doubtful that Jesus was buried by Joseph of Arimathea specifically. According to Ehrman, "what was originally a vague statement that the unnamed Jewish leaders buried Jesus becomes a story of one leader in particular, who is named, doing so." Ehrman gives three reasons for doubting a decent burial. Referring to Hengel and Crossan, Ehrman argues that crucifixion was meant "to torture and humiliate a person as fully as possible," and the body was normally left on the stake to be eaten by animals. Ehrman further argues that criminals were usually buried in common graves; and Pilate had no concern for Jewish sensitivities, which makes it unlikely that he would have allowed Jesus to be buried. 

A number of Christian authors have rejected the criticisms, taking the Gospel-accounts to be historically reliable. John A.T. Robinson states that "the burial of Jesus in the tomb is one of the earliest and best-attested facts about Jesus." Dale Allison, reviewing the arguments of Crossan and Ehrman, finds their assertions strong, but "find[s] it likely that a man named Joseph, probably a Sanhedrist, from the obscure Arimathea, sought and obtained permission from the Roman authorities to make arrangements for Jesus’s hurried burial." James Dunn states that "the tradition is firm that Jesus was given a proper burial (Mark 15.42-47 pars.), and there are good reasons why its testimony should be respected." 

Dunn argues that the burial tradition is "one of the oldest pieces of tradition we have," referring to 1 Cor. 15.4; burial was in line with Jewish custom as prescribed by Deut. 21.22-23 and confirmed by Josephus War; cases of burial of crucified persons are known, as attested by the Yehohanan burial; Joseph of Arimathea "is a very plausible historical character"; and "the presence of the women at the cross and their involvement in Jesus's burial can be attributed more plausibly to early oral memory than to creative story-telling." Andrew Loke, after replying to various objections against the historicity of the guards at the tomb, argues that "the presence of guards at the tomb would imply that Jesus was buried in a well-identified place (contrary to unburied hypothesis)."

According to religion professor John Granger Cook, there are historical texts that mention mass graves, but they contain no indication of those bodies being dug up by animals. There is no mention of an open pit or shallow graves in any Roman text. There are a number of historical texts outside the gospels showing the bodies of the crucified dead were buried by family or friends. Cook writes that "those texts show that the narrative of Joseph of Arimethaea's burial of Jesus would be perfectly comprehensible to a Greco-Roman reader of the gospels and historically credible."

Empty tomb

Skepticism about the empty tomb narrative
Early on, the stories about the empty tomb were met with skepticism. The Gospel of Matthew already mentions stories that the body was stolen from the grave. Other suggestions, not supported in mainstream scholarship, are that Jesus had not really died on the cross, or was lost due to natural causes.

The belief that Jesus did not really die on the cross but only appeared to do so is found in a wide variety of early texts, and probably has its historical roots in the earliest stages of Christianity. According to Israeli religion scholar Gedaliahu Stroumsa, this idea  came first, and later, docetism broadened to include Jesus was spirit without flesh. It is probable these were present in the first century, as it is against such doctrines that the author of 1 and 2 John seems to argue. 

The absence of any reference to the story of Jesus's empty tomb in the Pauline epistles and the Easter kerygma (preaching or proclamation) of the earliest church has led some scholars to suggest that Mark invented it. Allison, however, finds this argument from silence unconvincing. Most scholars believe that the Gospel of Mark and the Gospel of John contain two independent attestations of an empty tomb, which in turn suggests that both used already-existing sources and appealed to a commonly held tradition, though Mark may have added to and adapted that tradition to fit his narrative.

Empty tomb and resurrection appearances
N. T. Wright emphatically and extensively argues for the reality of the empty tomb and the subsequent appearances of Jesus, reasoning that as a matter of "inference" both a bodily resurrection and later bodily appearances of Jesus are far better explanations for the empty tomb and the 'meetings' and the rise of Christianity than are any other theories, including those of Ehrman.
Dale Allison has argued for an empty tomb, that was later followed by visions of Jesus by the Apostles and Mary Magdalene.

Smith argues that Mark has integrated two traditions, which were first separate, on the disappearance (from the tomb, interpreted as being taken to heaven) and appearance (post-mortem appearances), into one Easter narrative. According to Géza Vermes, the story of the empty tomb developed independently from the stories of the post-resurrection appearances, as they are never directly coordinated to form a combined argument. While the coherence of the empty tomb-narrative is questionable, it is "clearly an early tradition." Vermes notes that the story of the empty tomb conflicts with notions of a spiritual resurrection. According to Vermes, "[t]he strictly Jewish bond of spirit and body is better served by the idea of the empty tomb and is no doubt responsible for the introduction of the notions of palpability (Thomas in John) and eating (Luke and John)." Ehrman rejects the story of the empty tomb, and argues that "an empty tomb had nothing to do with it [...] an empty tomb would not produce faith." Ehrman argues that the empty tomb was needed to underscore the physical resurrection of Jesus.

Resurrection of a transformed body
Géza Vermes notes that the story of the empty tomb conflicts with notions of a spiritual resurrection. According to Vermes, "[t]he strictly Jewish bond of spirit and body is better served by the idea of the empty tomb and is no doubt responsible for the introduction of the notions of palpability (Thomas in John) and eating (Luke and John)."

Both Ware and Cook argue, primarily from Paul's terminology and the contemporary Jewish, pagan and cultural understanding of the nature of resurrection, that Paul held to a physically resurrected body (sōma), restored to life, but animated by spirit (pneumatikos) instead of soul (psuchikos), just like the later Gospel accounts. The nature of this resurrected body is a matter of debate. In 1 Corinthians 15:44, Paul uses the phrase "spiritual body" (sōma pneumatikos), which has been explained as a "Spirit-empowered body," but also as a "celestial body," made of a finer material than the flesh. 

In the Epistle to the Philippians Paul describes how the body of the resurrected Christ is utterly different from the one he wore when he had "the appearance of a man," and holds out a similar glorified state, when Christ "will transform our lowly body," as the goal of the Christian life – "flesh and blood cannot inherit the kingdom of God" (I Corinthians 15:50), and Christians entering the kingdom will be "putting off the body of the flesh" (Colossians 2:11). Paul opposed the notion of a purely spiritual resurrection, as propagated by some Christians in Corinth, which he addresses in 1 Corinthians. The developing Gospel-tradition emphasized the material aspects to counter this spiritual interpretation.

Paul's views of a bodily resurrection went against the thoughts of the Greek philosophers to whom a bodily resurrection meant a new imprisonment in a corporeal body, which was what they wanted to avoid – given that for them the corporeal and the material fettered the spirit.

James Dunn notes that there is a great difference between Paul's resurrection appearance, and the appearances described in the Gospels. Where "Paul's seeing was visionary [...], 'from heaven'," in contrast, the Gospel-accounts have a "massive realism" to them. Dunn contends that the "massive realism' [...] of the [Gospel] appearances themselves can only be described as visionary with great difficulty – and Luke would certainly reject the description as inappropriate." According to Dunn, most scholars explain this as a "legendary materialization" of the visionary experiences, "borrowing the traits of the earthly Jesus." Yet, according to Dunn, there was both "a tendency away from the physical [...] and a reverse tendency towards the physical." The tendency towards the material is most clear, but there are also signs for the tendency away from the physical, and "there are some indications that a more physical understanding was current in the earliest Jerusalem community."

According to Wright, there is substantial unanimity among the early Christian writers (first and second century) that Jesus had been bodily raised from the dead, "with (as the early Christians in their different ways affirmed) a 'transphysical' body, both the same and yet in some mysterious way transformed." According to Wright, Paul "believed he had seen the risen Jesus in person, and [...] his understanding of who this Jesus was included the firm belief that he possessed a transformed but still physical body."

Significance in Christianity

Foundation of Christian faith
In Christian theology, the death, resurrection, and exaltation of Jesus are the most important events, and the foundation of the Christian faith. The Nicene Creed states: "On the third day he rose again in accordance with the Scriptures". According to Terry Miethe, a Christian philosopher at Oxford University, the question " 'Did Jesus rise from the dead?' is the most important question regarding the claims of the Christian faith." According to John R. Rice, a Baptist evangelist, the resurrection of Jesus was part of the plan of salvation and redemption by atonement for man's sin. According to the Roman Catechism of the Catholic Church, the resurrection of Jesus causes and is the model of the resurrection of all the dead, as well as the cause and model of repentance, which the catechism calls "spiritual resurrection." Summarizing its traditional analysis, the Catholic Church states in its Catechism:

For orthodox Christians, including some scholars, the resurrection is taken to have been a concrete, material resurrection of a transformed body. Craig L. Blomberg argues there are sufficient arguments for the historicity of the resurrection.

In secular and liberal Christian scholarship, the post-resurrection appearances are explained as subjective visionary experiences in which Jesus's presence was felt, as articulated in the vision theory of Jesus's appearances. In the twenty-first century, modern scholars such as Gerd Lüdemann have proposed that Peter had a vision of Jesus, due to severe grief and mourning. Ehrman notes that "Christian apologists sometimes claim that the most sensible historical explanation for these visions is that Jesus [physically] appeared to the disciples."

First ekklēsia

The belief in the resurrection by Jesus's early followers formed the proclamation of the first ekklēsia (lit. "assembly"). The "visions of the resurrected/exalted Christ" reinforced the impact Jesus and his ministry had on his early followers, and interpreted in a scriptural framework they gave the impetus to Christ-devotion and the belief in the exaltation of Jesus. Jesus's death was interpreted in light of the scriptures as a redemptive death, being part of God's plan. The appearances also led to the resumption of the missionary activity of Jesus's followers, with Peter assuming the leadership role in the first ekklēsia (which formed the basis for the Apostolic succession).

In the Antiquities of the Jews, a 1st-century account of Jewish history by Josephus, believers of the resurrection are discussed. However, this reference to the resurrection is widely believed to have been added by a Christian interpolator. Within the  non-canonical literature of Gospel of Peter, there is a retelling of the resurrection of Jesus.

Ushering in the last days
Jesus's followers expected God's Kingdom to come soon, and Jesus's resurrection was the first event of the Endtime. As Borg and Crossan note, "For Mark the kingdom of God is already here because the Son of Man is already present."

Exaltation and Christology

Christ-devotion
The New Testament writings contend that the resurrection was "the beginning of His exalted life" as Christ and Lord. Jesus is the "firstborn of the dead," prōtotokos, the first to be raised from the dead, and thereby acquiring the "special status of the firstborn as the preeminent son and heir." According to Beale,

Hurtado notes that soon after his death, Jesus was called Lord (Kyrios), which "associates him in astonishing ways with God." The term Lord reflected the belief that God had exalted Jesus to a divine status "at God's 'right hand'." The worship of God as expressed in the phrase "call upon the name of the Lord [Yahweh]" was also applied to Jesus, invocating his name "in corporate worship and in the wider devotional pattern of Christian believers (e.g., baptism, exorcism, healing)."

According to Hurtado, powerful religious experiences were an indispensable factor in the emergence of Christ-devotion. Those experiences "seem to have included visions of (and/or ascents to) God's heaven, in which the glorified Christ was seen in an exalted position." Those experiences were interpreted in the framework of God's redemptive purposes, as reflected in the scriptures, in a "dynamic interaction between devout, prayerful searching for, and pondering over, scriptural texts and continuing powerful religious experiences." This initiated a "new devotional pattern unprecedented in Jewish monotheism," that is, the worship of Jesus next to God, giving Jesus a central place because his ministry, and its consequences, had a strong impact on his early followers. Revelations, including those visions, but also inspired and spontaneous utterances, and "charismatic exegesis" of the Jewish scriptures, convinced them that this devotion was commanded by God.

Ehrman notes that both Jesus and his early followers were apocalyptic Jews, who believed in the bodily resurrection, which would start when the coming of God's Kingdom was near. According to Ehrman, "the disciples' belief in the resurrection was based on visionary experiences," arguing that visions usually have a strong persuasive power, but also noting that the Gospel-accounts record a tradition of doubt about the appearances of Jesus. Ehrman's "tentative suggestion" is that only a few followers had visions, including Peter, Paul and Mary. They told others about those visions, convincing most of their close associates that Jesus was raised from the dead, but not all of them. Eventually, these stories were retold and embellished, leading to the story that all disciples had seen the risen Jesus. The belief in Jesus's resurrection radically changed their perceptions, concluding from his absence that he must have been exalted to heaven, by God himself, exalting him to an unprecedented status and authority.

Low and High Christology

It has long been argued that the New Testament writings contain two different Christologies, namely a "low" or adoptionist Christology, and a "high" or "incarnation Christology." The "low Christology" or "adoptionist Christology" is the belief "that God exalted Jesus to be his Son by raising him from the dead," thereby raising him to "divine status," as in Romans 1:4. The other early Christology is "high Christology," which is "the view that Jesus was a pre-existent divine being who became a human, did the Father’s will on earth, and then was taken back up into heaven whence he had originally come," and from where he appeared on earth. The chronology of the development of these early Christologies is a matter of debate within contemporary scholarship.

According to the "evolutionary model" c.q. "evolutionary theories," as proposed by Bousset, followed by Brown, the Christological understanding of Christ developed over time, from a low Christology to a high Christology, as witnessed in the Gospels. According to the evolutionary model, the earliest Christians believed that Jesus was a human who was exalted, c.q. adopted as God's Son, when he was resurrected, signaling the nearness of the Kingdom of God, when all dead would be resurrected and the righteous exalted. Later beliefs shifted the exaltation to his baptism, birth, and subsequently to the idea of his eternal existence, as witnessed in the Gospel of John. Mark shifted the moment of when Jesus became the son to the baptism of Jesus, and later still Matthew and Luke shifted it to the moment of the divine conception, and finally John declared that Jesus had been with God from the beginning: "In the beginning was the Word".

Since the 1970s, the late datings for the development of a "high Christology" have been contested, and a majority of scholars argue that this "High Christology" existed already before the writings of Paul. This "incarnation Christology" or "high Christology" did not evolve over a longer time, but was a "big bang" of ideas which were already present at the start of Christianity, and took further shape in the first few decades of the church, as witnessed in the writings of Paul.

According to Ehrman, these two Christologies existed alongside each other, calling the "low Christology" an "adoptionist Christology, and "the "high Christology" an "incarnation Christology." While adoptionism was declared heresy at the end of the 2nd century, it was adhered to by the Ebionites, who regarded Jesus as the Messiah while rejecting his divinity and his virgin birth, and insisted on the necessity of following Jewish law and rites. They revered James the brother of Jesus (James the Just); and rejected Paul the Apostle as an apostate from the Law. They show strong similarities with the earliest form of Jewish Christianity, and their specific theology may have been a "reaction to the law-free Gentile mission."

In the "pre-existence" Christology, Christ's resurrection and exaltation was a restoration of the exalted status he already had, but had not grasped at, as described in Philippians|2:6-11.

Redemptive death

Jesus's death was interpreted as a redemptive death "for our sins," in accordance with God's plan as contained in the Jewish scriptures. The significance lay in "the theme of divine necessity and fulfillment of the scriptures," not in the later Pauline emphasis on "Jesus's death as a sacrifice or an expiation for our sins." For the early Jewish Christians, "the idea that Messiah's death was a necessary redemptive event functioned more as an apologetic explanation for Jesus's crucifixion" "proving that Jesus's death was no surprise to God."

Call to missionary activity

According to Dunn, the appearances to the disciples have "a sense of obligation to make the vision known." Helmut Koester states that the stories of the resurrection were originally epiphanies in which the disciples were called to a ministry by the risen Jesus, and at a secondary stage were interpreted as physical proof of the event. He contends that the more detailed accounts of the resurrection are also secondary and do not come from historically trustworthy sources, but instead belong to the genre of the narrative types. 

Biblical scholar Géza Vermes argues that the resurrection is to be understood as a reviving of the self-confidence of the followers of Jesus, under the influence of the Spirit, "prompting them to resume their apostolic mission." They felt the presence of Jesus in their own actions, "rising again, today and tomorrow, in the hearts of the men who love him and feel he is near." According to Gerd Lüdemann, Peter convinced the other disciples that the resurrection of Jesus signaled that the end-times were near and God's Kingdom was coming, when the dead who would rise again, as evidenced by Jesus. This revitalized the disciples, starting-off their new mission.

Leadership of Peter

Peter claimed forcefully that Jesus appeared to him, and legitimised by Jesus's appearance he assumed leadership of the group of early followers, forming the Jerusalem ekklēsia mentioned by Paul. He was soon eclipsed in this leadership by James the Just, "the Brother of the Lord," which may explain why the early texts contain scarce information about Peter. According to Gerd Lüdemann, Peter was the first who had a vision of Jesus, noting that Peter and Mary both had appearance-experiences, but arguing that the tradition of Mary's appearance is a later development, and her appearance probably was not the first.

According to Christian proto-orthodoxy, Peter was the first to who Jesus appeared, and therefore the rightful leader of the Church. The resurrection forms the basis of the Apostolic succession and the institutional power of orthodoxy, as the heirs of Peter, to whom Jesus appeared, and is described as "the rock" on which the church will be built. Though the Gospels, and Paul's letters, describe appearances to a greater number of people, only the appearances to the Twelve Apostles count as lending authority and Apostolic succession.

Paul – participation in Christ

The appearance of Jesus to Paul convinced him that Jesus was the risen Lord and Christ, who commissioned him to be an apostle to the Gentiles. According to Newbigin, "Paul presents himself not as the teacher of a new theology but as the messenger commissioned by the authority of the Lord himself to announce a new fact – namely that in the ministry, death and resurrection of Jesus God has acted decisively to reveal and effect his purpose of redemption for the whole world." The teachings of the apostle Paul form a key element of the Christian tradition and theology. Fundamental to Pauline theology is the connection between Christ's resurrection, and redemption. In 1 Corinthians 15:13–14, 15:17, and 15:20-22, Paul writes:

The kerygma of 1 Corinthians 15:3 states that "Christ died for our sins." The meaning of that kerygma is a matter of debate, and open to multiple interpretations. Traditionally, this kerygma is interpreted as meaning that Jesus's death was an atonement or ransom for, or propitiation or expiation of, God's wrath against humanity because of their sins. With Jesus death, humanity was freed from this wrath. In the classical Protestant understanding, which has dominated the understanding of Paul's writings, humans partake in this salvation by faith in Jesus Christ; this faith is a grace given by God, and people are justified by God through Jesus Christ and faith in Him.

More recent scholarship has raised several concerns regarding these interpretations. According to E. P. Sanders, who initiated the so-called "New Perspective on Paul", Paul saw the faithful redeemed by participation in Jesus's death and rising. Though "Jesus's death substituted for that of others and thereby freed believers from sin and guilt," a metaphor derived from "ancient sacrificial theology," the essence of Paul's writing is not in the "legal terms" regarding the expiation of sin, but the act of "participation in Christ through dying and rising with him." According to Sanders, "those who are baptized into Christ are baptized into his death, and thus they escape the power of sin [...] he died so that the believers may die with him and consequently live with him." Just as Christians share in Jesus's death in baptism, so they will share in his resurrection. James F. McGrath notes that Paul "prefers to use the language of participation. One died for all, so that all died. This is not only different from substitution, it is the opposite of it."

Observance of the Law is needed to maintain the covenant, but the covenant is not earned by observing the Law, but by the grace of God.

Church Fathers – atonement

The Apostolic Fathers, discussed the death and resurrection of Jesus, including Ignatius (50–115), Polycarp (69–155), and Justin Martyr (100–165). The understanding of the Greek Fathers of the death and resurrection of Jesus as an atonement is the "classic paradigm" of the Church Fathers, who developed the themes found in the New Testament.

During the first millennium AD, the ransom theory of atonement was the dominant metaphor, both in eastern and western Christianity, until it was replaced in the west by Anselmus's satisfaction theory of atonement. The ransom theory of atonement says that Christ liberated humanity from slavery to sin and Satan, and thus death, by giving his own life as a ransom sacrifice to Satan, swapping the life of the perfect (Jesus), for the lives of the imperfect (humans). It entails the idea that God deceived the devil, and that Satan, or death, had "legitimate rights" over sinful souls in the afterlife, due to the fall of man and inherited sin.

The ransom theory was first clearly enunciated by Irenaeus (c. 130–c. 202), who was an outspoken critic of Gnosticism, but borrowed ideas from their dualistic worldview. In this worldview, humankind is under the power of the Demiurge, a lesser God who has created the world. Yet, humans have a spark of the true divine nature within them, which can be liberated by gnosis (knowledge) of this divine spark. This knowledge is revealed by the Logos, "the very mind of the supreme God," who entered the world in the person of Jesus. Nevertheless, the Logos could not simply undo the power of the Demiurge, and had to hide his real identity, appearing as a physical form, thereby misleading the Demiurge, and liberating humankind. In Irenaeus' writings, the Demiurge is replaced by the devil, while Justin Martyr had already equated Jesus and the Logos.

Origen (184–253) introduced the idea that the devil held legitimate rights over humans, who were bought free by the blood of Christ. He also introduced the notion that the devil was deceived in thinking that he could master the human soul.

Late Antiquity and early Middle Ages
Following the conversion of Constantine and the Edict of Milan in 313, the ecumenical councils of the 4th, 5th and 6th centuries, that focused on Christology, helped shape the Christian understanding of the redemptive nature of resurrection, and influenced both the development of its iconography, and its use within Liturgy.

Belief in bodily resurrection was a constant note of the Christian church in antiquity. Augustine of Hippo accepted it at the time of his conversion in 386. Augustine defended resurrection, and argued that given that Christ has risen, there is resurrection of the dead. Moreover, he argued that the death and resurrection of Jesus was for the salvation of man, stating: "to achieve each resurrection of ours, the savior paid with his single life, and he pre-enacted and presented his one and only one by way of sacrament and by way of model."

The 5th-century theology of Theodore of Mopsuestia provides an insight into the development of the Christian understanding of the redemptive nature of resurrection. The crucial role of the sacraments in the mediation of salvation was well accepted at the time. In Theodore's representation of the Eucharist, the sacrificial and salvific elements are combined in the "One who saved us and delivered us by the sacrifice of Himself". Theodore's interpretation of the Eucharistic rite is directed towards the triumph over the power of death brought about by the resurrection.

The emphasis on the salvific nature of the resurrection continued in Christian theology in the next centuries, e.g., in the 8th century Saint John of Damascus wrote that: "... When he had freed those who were bound from the beginning of time, Christ returned again from among the dead, having opened for us the way to resurrection" and Christian iconography of the ensuing years represented that concept.

Present-day
Lorenzen finds "a strange silence about the resurrection in many pulpits". He writes that among some Christians, ministers and professors, it seems to have become "a cause for embarrassment or the topic of apologetics". The idea of a bodily resurrection remains controversial. 

According to Warnock, many Christians neglect the resurrection because of their understandable preoccupation with the Cross.

Easter 

Easter (or Easter Sunday) is the preeminent Christian feast that celebrates the resurrection of Jesus, and, according to Susan J. White, "is clearly the earliest Christian festival." According to James Dunn, "In Easter we celebrate man become God [...] that in the death and resurrection of Christ God has broken the stranglehold of human selfishness, has proved the enduring and conquering strength of divine love." According to Thorwald Lorenzen, the first Easter led to a shift in emphasis from faith "in God" to faith "in Christ". According to Raymond Harfgus Taylor, Easter "focuses upon the consummation of the redemptive act of God in the death/resurrection of Jesus Christ."

Easter is linked to the Passover and Exodus from Egypt recorded in the Old Testament through the Last Supper and crucifixion that preceded the resurrection. According to the New Testament, Jesus gave the Passover meal a new meaning, as he prepared himself and his disciples for his death in the upper room during the Last Supper. He identified the loaf of bread and cup of wine as his body soon to be sacrificed and his blood soon to be shed. 1 Corinthians 5:7 states, "Get rid of the old yeast that you may be a new batch without yeastas you really are. For Christ, our Passover lamb, has been sacrificed"; this refers to the Passover requirement to have no yeast in the house and to the allegory of Jesus as the Paschal lamb. The Jewish feast of First-fruits is regarded by dispensationalists as foreshadowing its fulfilment in the resurrection of Jesus based on 1 Corinthians 15:20 "But Christ has indeed been raised from the dead, the firstfruits of those who have fallen asleep."

In Christian art 

In the Catacombs of Rome, artists indirectly hinted at the resurrection by using images from the Old Testament such as the fiery furnace and Daniel in the Lion's den. Depictions prior to the 7th century generally showed secondary events such as the Myrrhbearers at the tomb of Jesus to convey the concept of the resurrection. An early symbol of the resurrection was the wreathed Chi Rho (Greek letters representing the word "Khristos" or "Christ"), whose origin traces to the victory of emperor Constantine I at the Battle of the Milvian Bridge in 312, which he attributed to the use of a cross on the shields of his soldiers. Constantine used the Chi Rho on his standard and his coins showed a labarum with the Chi Rho killing a serpent.

The use of a wreath around the Chi Rho symbolizes the victory of the resurrection over death, and is an early visual representation of the connection between the Crucifixion of Jesus and his triumphal resurrection, as seen in the 4th-century sarcophagus of Domitilla in Rome. Here, in the wreathed Chi Rho the death and Resurrection of Christ are shown as inseparable, and the Resurrection is not merely a happy ending tucked at the end of the life of Christ on earth. Given the use of similar symbols on the Roman military banner, this depiction also conveyed another victory, namely that of the Christian faith: the Roman soldiers who had once arrested Jesus and marched him to Calvary now walked under the banner of a resurrected Christ.

The cosmic significance of the resurrection in Western theology goes back to Saint Ambrose, who in the 4th century said that "The universe rose again in Him, the heaven rose again in Him, the earth rose again in Him, for there shall be a new heaven and a new earth". This theme developed gradually in the West, later than in the East where the resurrection had been linked from an earlier date to redemption and the renewal and rebirth of the whole world. In art this was symbolized by combining the depictions of the resurrection with the Harrowing of Hell in icons and paintings. A good example is from the Chora Church in Istanbul, where John the Baptist, Solomon and other figures are also present, depicting that Christ was not alone in the resurrection. The depiction sequence at the 10th-century Hosios Loukas shows Christ as he pulls Adam from his tomb, followed by Eve, signifying the salvation of humanity after the resurrection.

Gallery of art 
 For a commons gallery see: Resurrection gallery

Relics 

The resurrection of Jesus has long been central to Christian faith and appears within diverse elements of the Christian tradition, from feasts to artistic depictions to religious relics. In Christian teachings, the sacraments derive their saving power from the passion and resurrection of Christ, upon which the salvation of the world entirely depends.

An example of the interweaving of the teachings on the resurrection with Christian relics is the application of the concept of "miraculous image formation" at the moment of resurrection to the Shroud of Turin.  Christian authors have stated the belief that the body around whom the shroud was wrapped was not merely human, but divine, and that the image on the shroud was miraculously produced at the moment of resurrection. Quoting Pope Paul VI's statement that the shroud is "the wonderful document of His Passion, Death and Resurrection, written for us in letters of blood" author Antonio Cassanelli argues that the shroud is a deliberate divine record of the five stages of the Passion of Christ, created at the moment of resurrection.

Views of other religions 
Groups such as Jews, Muslims, Baháʼís, and other non-Christians, as well as some liberal Christians, dispute whether Jesus actually rose from the dead. Arguments over death and resurrection claims occur at many religious debates and interfaith dialogues.

Judaism 

Christianity split from Judaism in the 1st century AD, and the two faiths have differed in their theology since. According to the Toledot Yeshu, the body of Jesus was removed in the same night by a gardener named Juda, after hearing the disciples planned to steal the body of Jesus. However, Toledot Yeshu is not considered either canonical or normative within rabbinic literature. Van Voorst states that Toledot Yeshu is a medieval document set without a fixed form which is "most unlikely" to have reliable information about Jesus. The Blackwell Companion to Jesus states that the Toledot Yeshu has no historical facts as such, and was perhaps created as a tool for warding off conversions to Christianity.

Gnostics 

Some Gnostics did not believe in a literal physical resurrection. "For the gnostic any resurrection of the dead was excluded from the outset; the flesh or substance is destined to perish. 'There is no resurrection of the flesh, but only of the soul', say the so-called Archontics, a late gnostic group in Palestine".

Islam 

Muslims believe that ʿĪsā (Jesus) son of Mariam (Mary) was a holy prophet with a divine message. The Islamic perspective is that Jesus was not crucified and will return to the world at the end of times. "But Allāh raised him up to Himself. And Allāh is Ever All-Powerful, All-Wise". The Quran says in Surah An-Nisa [Ch 004: Verse 157] "And because of their saying, 'We killed Messiah ʿĪsā, son of Maryam, the Messenger of Allāh',but they killed him not, nor crucified him, but it appeared so to them, and those who differ therein are full of doubts".

Islam Ahmadiyya 
Ahmadi Muslims believe that, as Jesus is the Messiah to the Children of Israel his objective was to gather their following. For this reason, Ahmadis believe that Jesus survived the crucifixion, as supported by the Qur'an, as a death on the cross would be a cursed one, supported by the Bible. This belief is held as Jesus had other "sheep" to tend to.

After surviving the crucifixion, Jesus and his mother migrated to another land where he continued his mission.

See also 
 Chronology of Jesus
 Outline of Jesus
 Divine Mercy Sunday
 Dying-and-rising god
 Tomb of Jesus
 The ground on which The Church of the Holy Sepulchre stands is venerated by most Christians as Golgotha, the Hill of Calvary, where the New Testament says that Jesus was crucified. This tomb is venerated as the tomb of Christ by the Catholic Church, Eastern Orthodox churches, and Oriental Orthodox churches.
 The Garden Tomb, discovered in the 19th century, is considered the actual site of Jesus's grave by some Protestant Christians.
 Talpiot Tomb, discovered in 1980, subject of the controversial 2007 documentary The Lost Tomb of Jesus

Notes

References

Sources 
Printed sources

 

 
 

 
 
 
 
 
 
 
 
 
 , 2nd ed. 2007
 
 
 
 

 

 

 

 

 
 

 
 
 
 
 
 
 
 
 
 

 
 
 
 

 
 
 
 

 
 

 
 
 
 
 
 
 

 
 
 
 

 
 
 
 
 
 

 
 
 
 
 
 

 
 
 
 

 

 
 

 

 
 

 
 

 

 
 
 
 
 

 
 
 

 
 
 
 

 
 
 
 
 
 
 
 

 Web-sources

External links 
 

 
1st century in Jerusalem
1st-century Christianity
30s
Christology
Glorious Mysteries
Origin myths